Tridensimilis brevis - pencil catfish native to South America. 
Tridensimilis brevis is distributed in the Amazon River basin in Brazil. T. brevis lives in the sand of shallow rivers and creeks. It is parasitic, entering the gill chambers of larger catfishes. It is also known for entering, probably by mistake, the urethra of mammals urinating under water.

References 

Trichomycteridae
Fish of South America
Fish of the Amazon basin